FREESOULS: Captured and Released by Joi Ito is a book by Joi Ito featuring 296 photographic portraits of members of the free culture movement. The project began in 2007 as way for Ito to freely distribute, through a Creative Commons Attribution license (CC BY), quality photos of the free culture community without the hindrance of copyright or permission. Freesouls also includes eight essays by major figures in the free culture movement, including Howard Rheingold, Lawrence Liang, Cory Doctorow, Isaac Mao, Christopher Adams, Yochai Benkler, Marko Ahtisaari, and a foreword by Lawrence Lessig. Isaac Mao's essay, "Sharism: A Mind Revolution", introduces Sharism for the first time.

The book was published in three editions, as a box set in an edition of 50, a soft-cover book in a print run of 1024, and a regular release. It was edited by Christopher Adams and Sophie Chang.

Essay content 

 Lawrence Lessig: Foreword by Lawrence Lessig
 Christopher Adams: Share this book
 Joi Ito: Just another free soul
 Howard Rheingold: Participative Pedagogy for a Literacy of Literacies
 Lawrence Liang: Free as in Soul: The Anti-image Politics of Copyright
 Cory Doctorow: You Can't Own Knowledge
 Yochai Benkler: Complexity and Humanity
 Isaac Mao: Sharism: A Mind Revolution
 Marko Ahtisaari: Intelligent Travel

References

External links 
Official site
Freesouls Twitter
Joi Ito's Flickr

2008 non-fiction books
Creative Commons-licensed books